Wilhelm Ludwig Karl Kurt Friedrich von Tümpling (b. 30 December 1809 - d. 13. February 1884) was a Prussian General der Kavallerie. Tümpling commanded a division in the Austro-Prussian War and VI Army Corps during the Franco-Prussian War.

Biography

Born in Pasewalk as a scion of the noble family von Tümpling, Wilhelm initially opted for a civilian career and studied law in Heidelberg.

On 25 July 1830 he entered the Guard Corps as a candidate-officer and on 18 June 1831 he was appointed second lieutenant. In the fall of 1833 he went to the general war school and in 1837 was appointed to the topographical office. From 1839 he belonged to the general staff. In 1840 he was promoted to first lieutenant. On 12 April 1842, he was appointed to the General Staff of the VIII Army Corps in Koblenz with the rank of captain. From there, in 1848, now promoted to major, he was transferred to the Great General Staff in Berlin. In 1849 he took part in the campaign in Baden.

In 1850 he was again in the field, first as a staff officer in the 4th Dragoons Regiment, and in 1853 with his own command in the 5th Cuirassier Regiment. In 1854 Tümpling took command of the 1st Guard Uhlan Regiment in Potsdam. At the end of 1857 he was appointed colonel and commander of the 11th Cavalry Brigade in Breslau. Tümpling stayed there until in 1863 he took over the 5th division in Frankfurt an der Oder.

In the Second Schleswig War in 1864, parts of his division came into combat at the Düppeler Schanzen and the occupation of Fehmarn, but he was not personally involved. During the Austro-Prussian War in 1866 Tümpling distinguished himself in the Battle of Gitschin, where he was wounded. For Gitschin he was awarded the Pour le Mérite. After the war he was governor-general of the occupied Kingdom of Saxony for a few weeks. In October 1866 Tümpling was given command of the VI Army Corps.

At the beginning of the Franco-Prussian War the VI Army Corps was kept in Silesia in order to be a deterrent to Austria entering the war on the French side. After it became clear that Austria would not participate in the war, the corps moved to France in August 1870 and was assigned to the 3rd Army. When the 3rd Army moved north towards Sedan, Tümpling remained as flank protection. His task was to intercept retreating French formations so that they could not get to Paris. The French 13th Corps, however, managed to escape this trap and reach Paris. During the Siege of Paris, Tümpling held the southwestern section. In this area he was able to fight back a French outage in the Battle of Chevilly.

After the war, Tümpling returned to Breslau with his corps. In 1883 Tümpling retired from the army due to his poor health, and eventually died in 1884 in Talstein near Jena.

Honours and awards
  Kingdom of Prussia:
 Knight of Honour of the Johanniter Order, 1847; Knight of Justice, 1858
 Knight of the Order of the Red Eagle, 4th Class with Swords, 1849; Grand Cross with Oak Leaves and Swords on Ring, 2 September 1873
 Knight of the Royal Order of the Crown, 2nd Class, 14 November 1861
 Commander's Cross of the Royal House Order of Hohenzollern, 7 December 1864
 Service Award Cross
 Pour le Mérite (military), 20 September 1866
 Iron Cross (1870), 1st Class with 2nd Class on Black Band
 Knight of the Order of the Black Eagle, 18 September 1875; with Collar, 1876
 : Commander of the  Order of the Zähringer Lion, 2nd Class, 1850
 : Grand Cross of the Military Merit Order
 : Knight of the Order of the Dannebrog, 16 April 1841
  Mecklenburg:
 Grand Cross of the House Order of the Wendish Crown, with Golden Crown
 Military Merit Cross, 2nd Class (Schwerin)
 : Commander of the Order of Adolphe of Nassau, 1st Class, September 1861
 :
 Knight of the Order of St. Anna, 2nd Class
 Knight of the Order of St. Stanislaus, 1st Class
 : Grand Cross of the Albert Order, 1872
 : Grand Cross of the Military Merit Order, 30 December 1870

Literature
 Howard, Michael, The Franco-Prussian War: The German Invasion of France 1870–1871, New York: Routledge, 2001. .
 Wawro, Geoffrey, The Austro-Prussian War. Austria's war with Prussia and Italy in 1866 (New York 2007)
 von Poten, Bernard, Tümpling, Wilhelm von. in Allgemeine Deutsche Biographie (ADB). Band 38, Duncker & Humblot, Leipzig 1894, S. 785–787.

References

1809 births
1884 deaths
German military personnel of the Franco-Prussian War
Prussian people of the Austro-Prussian War
Generals of Cavalry (Prussia)
Recipients of the Pour le Mérite (military class)
Recipients of the Iron Cross (1870), 1st class
Grand Crosses of the Military Merit Order (Bavaria)
Recipients of the Military Merit Cross (Mecklenburg-Schwerin)
Knights of the Order of the Dannebrog
Recipients of the Order of St. Anna, 2nd class
Military personnel from Mecklenburg-Western Pomerania